The River Sunar (also called Sonar) is a rain-fed river in the Indian state of Madhya Pradesh.

Geography 
The Sunar flows in the Bundelkhand region in Damoh district. Its overall length is more than 250 kilometres. It flows south to north like all Vindhyan rivers and Ganges system tributaries of central Indian rivers. It drains an approximately 12,000 square kilometre area of the southern boundary of Bundelkhand.

Sources 
Sunar River originates in Sagar District from a small hilly region in kesli block. So its initial source is near Tada village around 80 kilometers from Sagar District.

Tributaries 
There are many small tributaries of the Sunar. The most notable are the Bewas, Judi and Kopra Byarma rivers.

Settlements 
Villages and towns situated on the bank of the Sunar are kesli, Gadhakota, Hatta, Rehhli, Madiyado, Rangir narsighgarh and Maiher.

References

Rivers of Madhya Pradesh
Damoh district
Rivers of India